The Vogl House, is a historic home located near Masten's Corner, Kent County, Delaware. It was built by Bavarian immigrants Wilhelmine Vogl and John Vogl in 1915.  The "H"-shaped house consists of two large wings joined by a central section.  The house is constructed of concrete block and is a unique folk art house with lavish details.

It was listed on the National Register of Historic Places in 1976.  The listing included five contributing buildings and two contributing structures.

References

External links

Houses on the National Register of Historic Places in Delaware
Houses completed in 1915
Houses in Kent County, Delaware
Historic American Buildings Survey in Delaware
National Register of Historic Places in Kent County, Delaware